Ramburiella hispanica is a species of slant-faced grasshopper in the family Acrididae. It is found in southern Europe and northern Africa.

Subspecies
The Orthoptera Species File lists:
 R. hispanica hispanica (Rambur, 1838)
 R. hispanica latipedium Defaut & François, 2021
 R. hispanica magna Defaut & François, 2021

References

Further reading

External links

 

Gomphocerinae
Acrididae genera
Orthoptera of Africa
Orthoptera of Europe